Marks is a surname originating from Cornwall and Devon, and also a German or Jewish name. Individuals with this surname include:

Adolf Marks (1838–1904), Russian publisher
Alfred Marks (1921–1996), British comic actor and comedian
Ann Marks (1941–2016), British physicist and science communicator
Bob Marks (born 1932), American politician
Bruce Marks (born 1957), American politician
 Bryony Marks (born 1971), Australian screen composer
C. Hardaway Marks (1920–2004), American politician
Caren Marks (born 1963), German politician
David Marks (disambiguation)
Dennis Marks (screenwriter), (1932–2006), American television writer in animation including Batfink and The Beatles
Elias Marks (1790-1886), American physician and educator
Gloria Marks (born 1923), All-American Girls Professional Baseball League player
Harry Marks (disambiguation)
Heather Marks (born 1988), Canadian model
Howard Marks (1945–2016), British drug dealer and author
Howard Marks (investor) (born 1946), one of the founders of private equity firm Oaktree Capital Management
Jack Marks (ice hockey) (1882–1945), Canadian professional ice hockey player
Justin Marks (born 1981), American race car driver
Kenny Marks (1950–2018), American singer
Laurence Marks (British writer) (born 1948) British TV writer who usually wrote with Maurice Gran, mainly known for sitcoms such as The New Statesman and Birds of a Feather
Laurence Marks (American writer) (1915–1993), American writer for radio and television shows including M*A*S*H
Laurence Marks (journalist), (1928–1996), British journalist who wrote for many years for The Observer and The Sunday Times
Laurie J. Marks (born 1957), American fantasy writer
Leo Marks (1920–2001), British cryptographer and writer
Louis Marks (1928–2010), British television writer and script editor
Luba Marks, American fashion designer of French-Russian descent, former ballet dancer
Marc L. Marks (1927–2018), American politician and lawyer
Martin A. Marks (1853–1916), American businessman
Michael Marks (1859–1907), retailer, co-founder of the retail chain Marks & Spencer
Miko Marks, American singer-songwriter
Morris Lyon Marks (1824–1893)  politician in South Australia
Pheobe Sarah Marks (1854–1923) later Pheobe 'Hertha' Ayrton, female engineer, mathematician, inventor and first women to speak in the Institution of Electrical Engineers.  
Ryan Marks, American men's college basketball coach 
Sammy Marks a Lithuanian-born South African industrialist and financier 
Vic Marks (born 1955) Somerset and England cricketer and sports writer
Walter Marks (composer) (born 1934), musical theatre and film composer
Walter E. Marks (1905–1992), American college sports coach, administrator, and university instructor

See also
Marks rule
Marck
Marcks
Mark (surname)
Marx (surname)
Marx (disambiguation)

English-language surnames
German-language surnames
Jewish surnames
Surnames from given names
de:Marks
fr:Marks
pl:Marks
pt:Marks